Michael Edward Roger Minard (born November 1, 1976) is a Canadian former professional ice hockey goaltender who played in one National Hockey League game for the Edmonton Oilers during the 1999–00 season.

Playing career
Minard played with the Chilliwack Chiefs in the British Columbia Junior Hockey League (BCJHL) in the 1994–95 season, earning Coastal Rookie of the Year and Goaltender of the Year honours before he was selected in the fourth round, 83rd overall, by the Edmonton Oilers in the 1995 NHL Entry Draft. Most of his career was spent in the American Hockey League, and his lone NHL game came on April 8, 2000 against the Calgary Flames. Minard also played two seasons with the Belfast Giants of the British Elite Ice Hockey League, before returning to the North American minor leagues for a final season, and retired in 2008.

Personal

Minard previously served on the coaching staff for the AHL's Portland Pirates. He was terminated from the position, after he was arrested and charged for sexual misconduct after it was revealed he and a 13-year-old girl engaged in lewd text messages. On August 29, 2014, Minard was sentenced to two months in prison after pleading no contest to sexual misconduct charges.

Career statistics

Regular season and playoffs

Awards and honours

See also
List of players who played only one game in the NHL

References

External links

1976 births
Living people
Barrie Colts players
Belfast Giants players
Brantford Smoke players
Canadian expatriate ice hockey players in Northern Ireland
Canadian expatriate ice hockey players in the United States
Canadian ice hockey goaltenders
Columbia Inferno players
Dayton Bombers players
Detroit Whalers players
Edmonton Oilers draft picks
Edmonton Oilers players
Hamilton Bulldogs (AHL) players
Ice hockey people from Ontario
Manitoba Moose players
Memphis RiverKings players
Milwaukee Admirals (IHL) players
New Mexico Scorpions (CHL) players
New Orleans Brass players
Sportspeople from Owen Sound
Reading Royals players
St. John's Maple Leafs players
Toledo Storm players
Wheeling Nailers players